Norralaån is a river in Hälsingland, Sweden.

References

Rivers of Gävleborg County